Griček pri Željnah is a settlement immediately northeast of the town of Kočevje in southern Slovenia. The area is part of the traditional region of Lower Carniola and is now included in the Southeast Slovenia Statistical Region. The settlement has a Romani population.

History
Griček pri Željnah became an independent settlement in 2000, when it was administratively separated from neighboring Željne.

References

External links

Griček pri Željnah on Geopedia

Populated places in the Municipality of Kočevje